Avon Products, Inc. or simply known as Avon, is an American-British multinational cosmetics, skin care, fragrance and personal care company, based in London. It sells directly to the public. Avon had annual sales of $9.1 billion worldwide in 2020.

It is the fourteenth-largest beauty company and, with 6.4 million representatives, is the second largest direct-selling enterprise in the world (after Amway). The company's CEO is Angela Cretu who was appointed to the position in January 2020.

In May 2019, the multinational company Natura & Co announced its intent to acquire Avon; the deal closed in January 2020. Following the merger, existing Natura shareholders held  73% of the combined company, Natura Holding S.A., with former Avon shareholders owning 27%. At merger completion, Avon became a privately held company, common stock was removed from the NYSE trading.

History

Avon's founder, David H. McConnell, initially sold books as a door-to-door salesman to New York homes. In September 1886, he decided to sell perfumes rather than books. He started the new business in a small office at 126 Chambers Street, Manhattan, New York. McConnell changed the company name in 1892. His business partner suggested calling it the "California Perfume Company." His business partner was living in California at the time and suggested the name because of the abundance of flowers in California.

In May 1894, Alexander D. Henderson joined the company, became vice-president and treasurer, and helped shape its policies and assist in its growth. In 1897 they built a laboratory in Suffern, New York. On May 3, 1909, the California Perfume Company corporate office moved to 31 Park Place, New York. On June 16, 1909, McConnell and Henderson signed an agreement of Incorporation for the California Perfume Company in the state of New Jersey. On January 28, 1916, the California Perfume Company was incorporated in the state of New York. McConnell, Henderson, and William Scheele were listed as company officials. In 1939, the California Perfume Company changed its name to Avon.

International expansion

Avon sells products in over 100 countries. Brazil is the company's largest market, passing the United States in 2010. Avon entered the Chinese market in 1990. Direct selling was outlawed in China in 1998, which forced Avon to sell only through physical stores called Beauty Boutiques. The ban was lifted in 2001, and the company received a license for direct selling in 2006.

88% of Avon's 2013 revenue (around $10 billion) came from overseas markets.

Mergers and acquisitions
Avon purchased Silpada, a direct seller of silver jewelry, in 2010 for $650 million. In May 2012, perfume company Coty, Inc. offered $24.75 a share for Avon, which was nearly 20 percent above Avon's stock price at the time. While Fox Business Network reported that Avon delayed the process and Coty withdrew its offer, earlier reports said that Avon rejected the bid, stating "At the time, the board concluded, and it still believes, that Coty's indication of interest is opportunistic and not in the best interest of Avon's shareholders."

In March 2016, Cerberus Capital Management paid $435 million in cash for preferred stock in Avon Products. This move was the conclusion of a deal initiated in December 2015, when Avon sold 80.1 percent of its North American Business to Cerberus for $170 million. The total value of the deal was $605 million. The investment resulted in Cerberus having an almost 17 percent stake in Avon Products.

In January 2020, Natura &Co closed the acquisition of Avon Products, Inc. The Natura &Co group also includes Natura, Aesop, and The Body Shop, and with the acquisition of Avon has created the world's fourth-largest pure-play beauty company.

Recent history
In 2014, Avon's global sales had fallen for five straight years, and its North American revenues fell 18% that year.

In 2016, Avon completed the separation of its United States, Canada, and Puerto Rico business as New Avon LLC, which also trades with the "Avon" name. As part of a three-year plan, the global Avon Products moved its headquarters to London in the United Kingdom.

In August 2019, New Avon LLC, the privately held North American company that split from Avon Products, Inc. (Avon Worldwide) in 2016 entered into a definitive agreement with South Korean consumer goods giant LG Household & Health Care, Ltd., which will purchase the direct-selling cosmetics business for $125 million in cash. In January 2021, New Avon Company announced its corporate name change to The Avon Company.

Jan Zijderveld was appointed the company's CEO in February 2018. The former CEO, Sherilyn S. McCoy, stayed on as an adviser to the Board and to Zijderveld through March 31, 2018.

In 2019, the Brazilian beauty company Natura agreed to buy Avon Products for more than $2bn via a share swap, creating the world's fourth-largest beauty company. Under the deal's terms, Natura will hold 76% of the combined business with over $10 billion in annual revenue.

In June 2020, a new logo of Avon was released. 

In 2022, Avon decided to develop world-class Research and Development operations in Brazil and Poland, where representatives and consumers already reside. This is a part of Avon's Open Up and Grow strategy to establish a seamless supply chain network in two of their largest markets. This would result in the closing down of their R&D facility in Suffern, New York which has been in operation for 125 years. The company plans to start layoffs in March 2023, and officially close its doors in 2024.

Business model 

Avon uses both door-to-door salespeople ("Avon ladies", as well as "Avon men") and brochures to advertise its products. Some Avon training centers have a small retail section with skin care products, such as creams, serums, makeup, and washes. Avon recruits sales representatives who sell beauty products, jewelry, accessories, and clothing.

Some of the brand-names used by the company include Avon Color (also known as Avon True Color), mark., Imari, Far Away, Sweet Honesty, Little Dress Scents, Avon Fashions, Anew, Avon True NutraEffects, Naturals, Avon Care, Feelin Fresh and Skin So Soft. According to the U.S. government, Avon has 5 million to 6 million sales representatives operating in over 100 countries as of 2014. Avon and its subsidiaries have 40,000 to 50,000 employees, 6,000 of which are in the United States.

Avon was an early member of the U.S. Direct Selling Association, which was founded in 1910. The company left the association in 2014, saying that the trade group was not paying enough attention to the industry as a whole.

Controversies

American corruption charges
Beginning in 2008, the conduct of various employees and executives of Avon were investigated for possible violations of the law, including bribery and violations of the Foreign Corrupt Practices Act.

Avon began a probe of its China division after an internal whistleblower alleged bribery in June 2008. At least four executives, both in Asia and in the United States, were suspended in 2010, and later fired for their roles in the activities being investigated. According to The New York Times, Avon spent over $170 million on legal fees and costs related to the investigation: $59 million in 2009 and $95 million in 2010, and $22.5 million for the first quarter of 2011. The final tally was about $500 million.

The Times reported that Avon would report the findings to the United States Department of Justice and the Securities and Exchange Commission (SEC) and try to negotiate the penalties that those entities may impose. On February 24, 2011, Avon filed a report with the Securities and Exchange commission highlighting the investigation as a corporate risk factor that could cause investor loss.

In 2014, Avon settled the bribery charges for a total of $135 million; $68 million in criminal penalties, with the remainder in interest, disgorgement, and fines from a civil case brought by the SEC.

Animal testing

Avon vowed in 1989 that as a company located in the United States, it would no longer participate in animal testing. Avon has since claimed to be working globally to introduce safer methods of testing cosmetics that do not require animals. These methods include in vitro testing, computer simulations, and testing cosmetics on human volunteers.

Although Avon does not practice animal testing of its cosmetics that are sold in the United States, certain specialty products do require extensive testing in other countries. In China, specialty products that require degrees of animal testing include but are not limited to: sunscreen products, whitening/pigmentation products, and hair dye/perm or growth products. Despite laws that require animal testing in some countries, Avon chooses to distribute its products in those jurisdictions. Laws in various countries require companies to pay for animal testing through a commercial business in order to sell certain products in that country. Because Avon is not globally animal-testing free, People for the Ethical Treatment of Animals (PETA) has not included Avon on their cruelty-free list.

In 2019, Avon ended all regulatory-required animal testing, making it the first global beauty company selling in China to stop all animal testing of ingredients and products across all its brands by developing new ways to deliver products that do not require animal testing, such as reformulating products. PETA has since announced that it has added Avon Products Inc. to their list of companies "Working for Regulatory Change".

Withdrawal from major markets 
In October 2013, Avon announced the closure of its branch in France at the end of that month. Its French employees accused it of keeping the workers in the dark for months and not acting in line with the company's publicly stated values of being a socially responsible company that upholds values of trust, respect and integrity and a culture of "open and candid communication." As of January 2014, Avon France was in receivership.

This was followed by an announcement via Facebook on 15 February 2018, that Avon Australia and New Zealand would close by the end of the year. This decision resulted in the loss of 220 jobs and 21,400 sales representatives. The company has attracted criticism for poor communication with its customers and employees.

References

External links

 

Companies formerly listed on the New York Stock Exchange
Retail companies established in 1886
Cosmetics brands
Retail companies of the United Kingdom
Personal selling
1886 establishments in New York (state)
Cosmetics companies of the United Kingdom
Companies based in London
2020 mergers and acquisitions